Count Wolston Pierre Stuart de Beaumont (August 1, 1915 – December 4, 2010), aka Pete de Beaumont, was an American mechanical engineer who was a founder of Brookstone, a chain of specialty stores.

Birth and childhood
He was born in New York City, New York, the only child of Count François de Beaumont (died 1918), a French nobleman, and his American wife, the former Aedita Stuart (1889–1985), a daughter of U. S. diplomat Richard Stuart. The Beaumonts were divorced shortly after their son's birth, and the father was killed in action during World War I. Mother and son moved to the United States in 1919, where the mother pursued a brief career as a stage actress, using the name Gypsy Norman. She also appeared in at least one silent film, Fox Film Corp.'s Gentle Julia (1923), and wrote a three-act play called To Hell with Love.

On 25 October 1925 Aedita de Beaumont married Bud Fisher, the creator of the comic strip Mutt and Jeff, but the couple parted after four weeks. Since they were legally separated from 8 February 1927 until Fisher's death in 1954 and did not divorce, the rights to the strip passed to Aedita de Beaumont (as she continued to be known) and then to her son.

Education and career
After attending private schools in the United States, Canada, and England, Pierre de Beaumont earned a bachelor's degree in engineering from Harvard University in 1938.

He began his career in the yacht building and automotive industries, working at companies including Packard  and General Motors. He later worked for Apex Electrical Manufacturing and Bostitch Inc.

During World War II, he served in the United States Naval Reserve.

Marriages
Pierre de Beaumont was married to:

Barbara Anne Longstreth, whom he married on 29 August 1942. They divorced prior to 1960 and had no children.
Mary Deland Kelley (née Robbins, 1933–2001), whom he married in 1960. By this marriage he had three stepchildren.

Company
Mary and Pierre de Beaumont founded Brookstone in 1965 and sold it in 1980. The company is named for their farm in the Berkshires.

Philanthropy
In 1998 Pierre de Beaumont founded the de Beaumont Foundation, which focuses on public health.

Death
He died at his home in Manchester-by-the-Sea, Massachusetts..

References

1915 births
2010 deaths
Harvard School of Engineering and Applied Sciences alumni
Counts of France
American mechanical engineers
American businesspeople in retailing
Comics people
People from Manchester-by-the-Sea, Massachusetts